The Rural Municipality of Minto is a former rural municipality (RM) in the Canadian province of Manitoba. It was originally incorporated as a rural municipality on November 15, 1902. It ceased on January 1, 2015 as a result of its provincially mandated amalgamation with the RM of Odanah to form the Rural Municipality of Minto-Odanah.

The former RM is located north of Brandon and was named after Sir Gilbert Elliot-Murray-Kynynmound, 4th Earl of Minto. The former RM's economic base is primarily agricultural. The historic community of Clanwilliam lies in the northern part of the former RM.

Communities 
 Bethany
 Clanwilliam

References 

 Manitoba Municipal Profiles

External links 
 Map of Minto R.M. at Statcan

Former rural municipalities in Manitoba
Populated places disestablished in 2015
2015 disestablishments in Manitoba